LP 890-9, also known as SPECULOOS-2 or TOI-4306, is a high proper motion red dwarf star located  away from the Solar System in the constellation of Eridanus. As of 2022, it is the second-coolest star found to host a planetary system, after TRAPPIST-1.

Planetary system 

In 2022, two exoplanets were discovered in orbit around this star. The first planet, LP 890-9 b, was initially identified using TESS. Further observations using SPECULOOS confirmed this planet and discovered a second planet, LP 890-9 c. Both planets are likely terrestrial planets, somewhat larger than Earth. The outer planet LP 890-9 c orbits within the habitable zone, and is a favorable target for atmospheric characterization using JWST.

LP 890-9 c orbits near the inner edge of the conservative habitable zone, and models differ as to whether the planet is more likely to resemble Earth or Venus. Spectra from JWST should make it possible to distinguish between these two scenarios. The planet is tidally locked. While the planet's location in the habitable zone suggests a strong possibility of an Earth-like atmosphere and climate, the planet's large size may count against its habitability. In addition, the planet is close enough to its star that powerful radiation may reduce its habitability.

See also 
 Proxima Centauri - Closest star to the Sun, a red dwarf that hosts terrestrial planets with one inside the habitable zone 
 Teegarden's Star - A nearby red dwarf with two terrestrial planets in the habitable zone, in the constellation of Aries
 TRAPPIST-1 - An ultra-cool red dwarf in the constellation of Aquarius
 Wolf 359 - A planet hosting nearby ultra-cool red dwarf in the Leo constellation

Notes

References 

Eridanus (constellation)
M-type main-sequence stars
Planetary systems with two confirmed planets
J04163114-2818526
4306